Cervo, is a municipality in the Spanish province of Lugo.

References

Municipalities in the Province of Lugo